Bünyadlı or  or Buniyatly or Binyatly or Biniatlou may refer to:
Bünyadlı, Beylagan, Azerbaijan
Bünyadlı, Khojavend, Azerbaijan
Bunyadly, Azerbaijan